The Aichi AB-3 was a Japanese ship-board reconnaissance floatplane of the 1930s. The AB-3, a single-seat, single-engined biplane, was designed to equip a light cruiser Ning Hai being built in Japan for the Chinese navy, a single aircraft being accepted by the Chinese.

Development and design
In 1928, the Republic of China Navy, keen to modernise its obsolete fleet, placed orders for a class of two light cruisers, the Ning Hai class, to be designed in Japan, with the lead ship to be built at the Harima shipyard in Japan, and the second ship, with Japanese help, in China.  The ships were designed to carry two small seaplanes each, with a small hangar being provided for a folded aircraft, and the Japanese Navy placed an order with Aichi for a single seat floatplane to equip these ships.

Aichi's designer, Tetsuo Miki based his design on his Aichi AB-2 two seat floatplane which was under design for the Imperial Japanese Navy, producing a small single-seat biplane of mixed wood and metal construction with single-bay wings, powered by a 130 hp (97 kW) Gasuden Jimpu radial engine.  It had twin floats, and had detachable wings to aid storage aboard ship.  The prototype AB-3 was completed in January 1932, and when flown for the first time in February that year proved to have excellent performance, exceeding the specification in all ways.

Operational history
The prototype was accepted by the Chinese navy, but no further production ensued, the Chinese instead building a similar aircraft of local design, the Naval Air Establishment Ning Hai, powered by the same engine that powered the AB-3.

Specifications (AB-3)

Notes

References

Gardiner, Robert and Chesneau, Roger (editors). Conway's All The World's Fighting Warships  1922–1946. London:Conway Maritime Press, 1980. .
Mikesh, Robert C. and Shorzoe Abe. Japanese Aircraft 1910-1941. London:Putnam, 1990. .

1930s Japanese military reconnaissance aircraft
Floatplanes
AB-3
Biplanes
Single-engined tractor aircraft
Aircraft first flown in 1932